The Ecuador women's national basketball team is the official women's basketball team for Ecuador.

References

External links
 Ecuador at FIBA Americas

Women's national basketball teams in South America
National team
Basketball